Very Good Bad Thing is the fifth album by Vancouver-based indie rock band Mother Mother. It was produced by Gavin Brown.

Track listing 
All songs written by Ryan Guldemond.

Mastered by Ted Jensen at Sterling Sound, NYC

Personnel 
Molly Guldemond – vocals and keyboard
Ryan Guldemond – guitar and vocals
Jasmin Parkin – keyboard and vocals
Ali Siadat – drums
Jeremy Page – bass

References 

Mother Mother albums
2014 albums
Albums produced by Gavin Brown (musician)
Albums recorded at Noble Street Studios